Allen Icet (born March 31, 1957) is a Republican politician. He served in the Missouri House of Representatives from 2002 to 2010 and as Chairman of the House Budget Committee from 2005 to 2010. Icet was appointed Greene County Collector on March 1, 2021.

Early life and education

Icet was born March 31, 1957 in Houston, Texas.

In 1980, Icet received a Bachelor of Science from Texas A&M University in Civil Engineering. He also received a Master of Business Administration from the Olin Business School at Washington University in St. Louis.

Career

Icet is a past president (1995–96) and director (1994–96) of the Rockwood Board of Education for Saint Louis County's largest public school system. He was on the Rockwood School District Advisory Council, which serves more than 22,000 students. In 2000, Icet served as a delegate to the Missouri Republican Convention. He also served on Minority Leader Catherine Hanaway's 2001 Blue Ribbon Budget Committee.

Icet became a delegate of the Missouri Republican Convention in 2000 and served as a Member of the former House Minority Leader Catherine Hanaway's 2001 Blue Ribbon Commission, recommending steps towards realistic budgeting. In 2002, he was elected to the Missouri House of Representatives, succeeding Democratic incumbent Joan Bray. During his tenure in the House he served on six different committees. In 2005, after a year as Vice-Chair, he began serving as Chairman of the House Budget Committee.

In 2007, Icet was nominated as a successor to then-Speaker of the House Rod Jetton. Fellow Republican Ron Richard ultimately won the nomination and subsequent speakership, and Icet remained in his position in the Budget Committee.

Icet left the House of Representatives in 2010, after eight years in office, the longest term allowed. He was succeeded by fellow Republican Don Gosen, who ran unopposed in the 2010 election.

In June 2009, Icet announced his intentions to run for State Auditor of Missouri in the 2010 election. On July 7, Republican Tom Schweich announced his 2010 candidacy for the same position, forcing a Republican primary. Also on July 7, 2009, Icet announced endorsements from 80 Missouri Representatives and two state Senators.

, Icet is a consultant for energy company ConocoPhillips on capital expansion projects.

Icet was appointed as Greene County Collector by Governor Mike Parson on March 1, 2021, to fulfill the remainder of previous Collector Leah Betts' term, after she tendered a resignation. This partial, three-year term ended on March 1, 2023.

Personal life

Icet resides in Wildwood, Missouri with his wife, Carol. They have four children: Sarah, Melissa, Alexandra and Daniel. Icet attends Ballwin Baptist Church, and formerly served on the board of directors for Ballwin Christian Academy.

Electoral history

Icet has won four elections to the Missouri House of Representatives. In three elections, the seat was uncontested.

References

Election references
The following is a list of all pages containing election results used for this article.

External links
 
 Biography at Ballotpedia

1957 births
Living people
Republican Party members of the Missouri House of Representatives
People from St. Louis County, Missouri
Texas A&M University alumni
Olin Business School (Washington University) alumni
People from Houston